The 2001 Sunamganj bombing was a bomb attack on 26 September 2001 at a meeting of Bangladesh Awami League in Sullah Upazila, Sunamganj, Bangladesh that resulted in the death of 4 people.

Background
The caretaker government was in charge and responsible for holding the general elections. The government had deployed 50 military personnel for extra security during the election. A Bangladesh Awami League election rally on 23 September 2001 was bombed in Bagerhat District.

Attacks
Bangladesh Awami League were campaigning for the 2001 Bangladeshi general election. Bangladesh Awami League is a secular political party. On 26 September 2001, a Bangladesh Awami League rally in Sunamganj District was bombed killing 4 and wounding 10 people. The rally was led by Bangladesh Awami League politician Suranjit Sengupta.

Trial
The Sunamganj bomb attack remains unsolved as of 2008. The government of Bangladesh believes Mufti Abdul Hannan, the leader of Harkat-ul-Jihad al-Islami Bangladesh, was responsible for the attack. He was executed on 12 April 2017.

References

History of Bangladesh (1971–present)
Terrorist incidents in Bangladesh in 2001
Terrorist incidents in Bangladesh
Islamic terrorist incidents in 2001
Mass murder in 2001
2001 murders in Bangladesh
Terrorism in Bangladesh